China competed at the 2022 World Aquatics Championships in Budapest, Hungary from 18 June to 3 July.

Medalists

Artistic swimming

Women

Mixed

Diving

Men

Women

Mixed

Open water swimming

 Men

 Women

 Mixed

Swimming

China  entered 34 swimmers.
Men

Women

Mixed

 Legend: (*) = Swimmers who participated in the heat only.

Water polo

Women's tournament

Summary

References

World Aquatics Championships
2022
Nations at the 2022 World Aquatics Championships